Rhabdochaeta asteria is a species of tephritid or fruit flies in the genus Rhabdochaeta of the family Tephritidae.

Distribution
Japan, Taiwan, India to Vietnam, Philippines, Papua New Guinea.

References

Tephritinae
Insects described in 1915
Diptera of Asia